Elle Fowler (born May 25, 1988) and Blair Fowler (born April 1, 1993) are sisters who posted beauty and style-related tutorials on YouTube as AllThatGlitters21 (Elle) and juicystar07 (Blair). Elle came into the beauty and fashion world during the summer of 2008 and convinced Blair to join her. Their videos of makeup tutorials and clothing hauls quickly garnered a large audience and rose in popularity. As of August 2017, Elle's videos on AllThatGlitters21 have been viewed more than 180 million times, while Blair's channel juicystar07 has received over 270 million views.

Both sisters previously posted vlogs under the monikers EllesGlitterGossip and otherjuicystar07, allowing subscribers to keep track of their daily lives outside of the YouTube community. Their respective second YouTube channels move away from purely beauty and fashion-related videos and branch into other topics such as health & fitness, their daily musings, and other random interests.

In late 2015, it was announced that Blair and the girls' father, Scott, would be cast in The Amazing Race 28, which will be a special edition with social media personalities but their season came to an end in Leg 7 where they placed 7th.

Backgrounds
The sisters were born to Dr. Scott Fowler, a physician, and Melisa Fowler. Their mother is of Turkish origin and was born in Istanbul, Turkey. "Elle" was born Lisa Sylvia Fowler on May 25, 1988, and "Blair" was born Laura Elizabeth Fowler on April 1, 1993, in Augusta, Georgia. Their younger sister, Emily Kaitlin-Rose Fowler, was born on October 15, 2002. After Blair's fifth birthday, the family relocated from New Orleans to Kingsport, Tennessee, where Blair attended Dobyns-Bennett High School. Elle attended Miami University in Ohio where she joined Alpha Chi Omega. They adopted the aliases Elle and Blair as their DBA names when they began their online careers, because their parents did not want them to use their real names.

YouTube career
The sisters first began posting YouTube videos in 2008. In 2010 their videos received over 75 million views. They were later invited by Seventeen to offer makeup tips and suggestions to readers and in an interview with Good Morning America Blair mentioned that she had to become homeschooled due to a bullying situation in her sophomore year of high school. The two have received criticism over their haul videos potentially fueling shopping addictions and cultural idealizations of consumption and materialism, with an expert in shopping addiction listing the video as an example. In 2012 the Fowlers became the hosts and main judges of the webseries Beauty Vlogger Boot Camp, which revolved around young men and women aspiring to be online gurus. Each episode had the contestants competing in a beauty-related challenge, with one person getting eliminated before the next round begins. They have also been nominated twice for Teen Choice Awards in the "Web Star" category for 2011 and 2012. They were also nominated for the 2014 Teen Choice Awards under the category "Choice Web Star-Beauty/Fashion."

The two later released a novel entitled Beneath the Glitter (written by a ghostwriter, as cited at the end of it), with the character supposedly being only loosely based on the sisters. The Fowlers have also released a makeup line, Skylark. It later sparked controversy when they released three sample perfumes (Skylark Memoir Fragrance Collection) while having their audience vote for one of them, which would ultimately be made as a full size perfume. However, they stopped mentioning those samples, leading to frustrated followers contacting the company and being told that there will not be a full size fragrance, and that they can get a refund. In May 2020, Elle discussed what had happened with Skylark in her video “What happened to Skylark?!” She stated that the company producing the Skylark perfume backed out of their agreement, and told the sisters that they were not able to address the situation to their followers. Elle remarked that “it almost ruined us” and the experience turned the pair off from future endeavors in cosmetics.

In October 2012 it was announced that they would release a shoe and handbag line in conjunction with online fashion retailer JustFab.

In 2015, Elle started an online planner sticker shop called "Glam Planner." She created a third YouTube channel in support of this venture that she posts videos to regularly. For a few years, she stopped posting on her channel, but recently started again stating that she will make videos again but not consider it her full-time job

Bibliography

London Sisters series
Beneath the Glitter (September 1, 2012)
Where Beauty Lies (August 13, 2013)

Personal life
On July 3, 2015, Elle became engaged to singer and songwriter Alex Goot. He proposed on the beach, wrote the song "Unstoppable" about her, and played it during the proposal. On June 19, 2016, they were married at the Bacara Resort in Santa Barbara, California. Their first child, James Alexander Goot, was born on June 21, 2018. On September 29, 2021 Elle announced she is pregnant with their 2nd child and due in April 2022. Their second son, Scott William Goot, was born on April 4th 2022. In early 2019, the sisters both announced their relocation to Tennessee. As of May 2020, they both reside in Nashville, Tennessee. Blair began attending college, majoring in Interior Design, in Tennessee and is due to graduate in 2022.

References

External links
YouTube Channel
Blair's Twitter Account
Elle's Twitter Account

American make-up artists
American people of Turkish descent
American YouTubers
Living people
People from Kingsport, Tennessee
The Amazing Race (American TV series) contestants
Sibling duos
Video bloggers
American women bloggers
American bloggers
Year of birth missing (living people)
People from Nashville, Tennessee
Beauty and makeup YouTubers
People from Augusta, Georgia
Fashion YouTubers
21st-century American women